The Sitones were a Germanic people living somewhere in Northern Europe in the first century CE. They are mentioned only by Cornelius Tacitus in 97 CE in Germania. Tacitus considered them similar to Suiones (ancestors of modern Swedes) apart from one descriptor, namely that women were the ruling sex.

Upon the Suiones, border the people Sitones; and, agreeing with them in all other things, differ from them in one, that here the sovereignty is exercised by a woman. So notoriously do they degenerate not only from a state of liberty, but even below a state of bondage.

Speculations on the Sitones' background are numerous. According to one theory, the name is a partial misunderstanding of Sigtuna, one of the central locations in the Swedish kingdom, which much later had a Latin spelling Situne.

Another view is that the "queen" of the Sitones derives by linguistic confusion with an Old Norse word for "woman" from the name of the Kvens or Quains.

According to medievalist Kemp Malone (1925), Tacitus' characterization of both the Suiones and the Sitones is "a work of art, not a piece of historical research", with the Sitones' submission to a woman as the logical culminating degeneracy after the Suiones' total submission to their king and surrendering of their weapons to a slave.

See also
 List of Germanic tribes

References 

Early Germanic peoples
North Germanic tribes
Prehistory of Sweden
Scandinavia